Sowmya Sharma is an Indian voice actor, RJ, and a script writer who works in Telugu films. She has lent her voice for leading actresses of Telugu and Tamil cinema including Anushka Shetty, Kajal Aggarwal, Nayanthara, and Shruthi Haasan among others. Her work in Baahubali: The Beginning (2015) and Baahubali 2: The Conclusion (2017) earned her Nandi Award for Best Female Dubbing Artist by the Government of Andhra Pradesh.

Personal life
Sowmya is married to Telugu film director Anand Ranga and lives in Hyderabad.

Career
Over the years, Sowmya has done many hats in her career. She worked as an RJ, dubbing artist and currently working as a scriptwriter for OK Jaanu, America Ammayi and Chhota Bheem.

As dubbing artist
Over her career as a dubbing artist, she dubbed for over 500 films and was awarded the highest award ceremony for excellence in Telugu cinema, Nandi Awards, twice. She received the first Nandi award for Lakshyam, where she lent her voice for Anushka Shetty and the second one was for the movie Mahatma in which she gave voice over for the actresses Bhavana.

Filmography

As a voice over artist

As a scriptwriter

References

Living people
Indian voice actresses
Nandi Award winners
Indian women screenwriters
Year of birth missing (living people)
Telugu screenwriters
Telugu people